Powhatan or Virginia Algonquian was an Eastern Algonquian subgroup of the Algonquian languages. It was formerly spoken by the Powhatan people of tidewater Virginia. Following 1970s linguistic research by Frank Thomas Siebert, Jr., some of the language has been reconstructed with assistance from better-documented Algonquian languages, and attempts are being made to revive it.

The sole documentary evidence for this language is two short wordlists recorded around the time of first European contact. William Strachey recorded about 500 words and Captain John Smith recorded only about 50 words. Smith also reported the existence of a pidgin form of Powhatan, but virtually nothing is known of it.

Strachey's material was collected sometime between 1610 and 1611, and probably written up from his notes in 1612 and 1613, after he had returned to England. It was never published in his lifetime, although he made a second copy in 1618. The second copy was published in 1849, and the first in 1955.

Smith's material was collected between 1607 and 1609 and published in 1612 and again in 1624. There is no indication of the location where he collected his material. Like many Algonquian languages, Powhatan did not have a writing system, so all that is left are the writings from the 17th century and the piecing together that can be done using related Algonquian languages.

Although the language has become extinct, some of the tribes that were part of the Powhatan Chiefdom still remain close to their lands. These tribes include Upper Mattaponi, Mattaponi, Nansemond, Chickahominy, Pamunkey and Patawomeck, all of whom are either recognized by the Commonwealth of Virginia or the federal government. There is also the Powhatan Renape Nation (formerly located on the Rankokus Indian Reservation in Burlington, New Jersey) that is working to reclaim their culture and educate the public.

Family and origin

Powhatan is an Algic language. It is closely related to Unami, Munsee, Nanticoke, Massachusett, and other Eastern Algonquian languages, is more distantly related to Ojibwe, Cree, Cheyenne, Blackfoot, and other Algonquian languages, and is most distantly related to Wiyot and Yurok.

Historical phonological changes
Based on his work to reconstruct Powhatan, Siebert was able to compare the changes that the language might have made compared to Proto-Algonquian and Proto-Eastern Algonquian. Here are three of the most basic changes his research pinpointed:

Ex: PA  'it is high' →  .
Word final vowels are deleted if they are preceded by a consonant between Proto-Algonquian and Powhatan. Ex: PA  'earthwork' →  .
Ex: PA  'duck' →  ; PA  'sand' →  ; PA  'little dog' →  .

History

Pre-colonial history
The Powhatan language formed from a split from other Eastern Algonquian languages, and southward moving groups replaced earlier cultures in the area as the language became more distinct. There is no certainty as to whether or not Carolina Algonquian was a distinct language from Powhatan, as ultimately Carolina Algonquian groups such as the Chowanoke, Croatan, and Machapunga are ethnically branches of the Powhatan groups of Virginia.

Powhatan was likely the dominant language of what is now eastern Virginia, and was used in the Powhatan Chiefdom.

European contact
The first Europeans to encounter the Powhatan were the Spanish. They gave this region the name Ajacán, and they may have sailed up the Potomac River; however, Spanish colonization ultimately failed in this area.

English colonists arrived in 1607 with Captain John Smith, and established the settlement of Jamestown. Smith recorded only about 50 words in Powhatan, but William Strachey, a writer and fellow colonist, managed to record about 500 words. Because at this time Powhatan was still the dominant language, and because during the early years the English colonists were dependent on the Powhatan for food, the colonists had to learn the newly encountered language.

The English language started borrowing many words from Powhatan; the language has been credited with being the source of more English loans than any other indigenous language. Most such words were likely borrowed very early, probably before conflict arose between the Powhatan and the colonists in 1622.

Among these words are: chinquapin (Castanea pumila), chum (as in chumming), hickory, hominy, matchcoat, moccasin, muskrat, opossum, persimmon, pokeweed, pone (as in corn pone), raccoon, terrapin, tomahawk, and wicopy.

As English colonists continued to expand onto Powhatan territory, the reverse began to happen: Powhatan people now had to learn English. Spoken Powhatan language has declined since 1790.

Modern era
In recent decades there has been an interest in reviving the lost language, especially by the descendants of the Powhatan Confederacy. In 1975, Frank Siebert, a linguist specializing in Algonquian languages, published a book-length study claiming the "reconstitution" of the phonology of the language.

For the film The New World (2005), which tells the story of the English colonization of Virginia and encounter with the Powhatan, Blair Rudes made a tentative reconstruction of the language "as it might have been."

A specialist in the Indigenous languages of North Carolina and Virginia, he used the Strachey and Smith wordlists, as well as the vocabularies and grammars of other Algonquian languages and the sound correspondences that appear to obtain between them and Powhatan. More specifically, he used a Bible translated into Massachusett to piece together grammar and Proto-Algonquian to compare the words in Smith and Strachey's records. 

Linguists with the College of William and Mary are working with the Patawomeck tribe to recover the language and have made strides in doing so. The Patawomeck tribe offers classes in Stafford, Virginia, on the language.

Phonology

Consonants
This table is based on Frank T. Siebert's reconstruction of the Powhatan language. He used the notes of John Smith but relied primarily on the work of William Strachey recorded between 1610 and 1611. Siebert also used his knowledge of the patterns of other Algonquian languages in determining the meaning of Strachey's notes. This table provides the practical symbols along with their IPA equivalents, in brackets.

Vowels
Siebert reconstructs the following vowels for Powhatan (with assumed IPA equivalents in brackets):

Syllable structure

Siebert does not specifically go over the structure of syllables, but using the lexicon and examples that he does provide, (C)V(ː)(C) pattern can be determined. Clusters within words are limited to two consonants, CVCCVC.

Stress
Syllable weight is determined based on whether or not the first syllable contains a weak vowel. If it does, then even-numbered syllables are heavy and odd-numbered syllables are light. For example, which means 'sun', would be pronounced . If the word starts with a strong vowel, then it is the opposite, with the even-numbered syllables being light and the odd-numbered syllables being heavy. For example, which means 'good', would be pronounced .
 
There are two kinds of syncope: major and minor. Major syncopation happens in morphemes that are three or more syllables in the middle of the word. Some examples of this are in the words for 'spoon' and 'broom'. The word for 'spoon' would be pronounced , but with major syncopation, it is pronounced . The word for 'broom' would be pronounced , but with the syncopation, it becomes . Note that the last example is a prime example of the light syllable that ends in  being syncopated.

Minor syncopation tends to be optionally and only seen is specific dialects.

Historical phonological changes
Based on his work to reconstruct Powhatan, Siebert was able to compare the changes that the language might have made compared to Proto-Algonquian and Proto-Eastern Algonquian. Here are three of the most basic changes his research pinpointed:

Ex: PA  'it is high' → .

Word-final vowels are deleted if they are preceded by a consonant between Proto-Algonquian and Powhatan. Ex: PA  'earthwork' → 

Ex: PA  'duck' → ; PA  'sand' → ; PA  'little dog' → .

Grammar

Nouns
In Powhatan, nouns take inflective affixes depending on their class. There seems affixes only added to third person nouns. These nouns are not only categorized as singular and plural, but also animate and inanimate. For the animate group there are the proximate and obviative classes; the proximate class is for nouns considered more salient, and the obviative class is for nouns considered less salient. This is quite common for Algonquian languages, and strongly reflects the traditional worldview of Powhatan groups, as well as other Algonquian-speaking groups.

Diminutives
Powhatan has six affixes for naming items diminutively. These affixes function by a rule of internal sandhi. The last ending in the list is the most commonly seen diminutive. The following are the affixes themselves:
 -ins ex:  'little stick'
 -ēns ex:  'small cord'
 -ēs or -īs ex:  'small coal'
 -iss ex:  'old woman'
 -ēss ex:  'muskrat'
 -ess  ex:  'ant'

Verbs
There are three types of verb affixes of the Powhatan language, all of which are inflective. Powhatan is a language that follows an agglutinative pattern. Although it might have lost some of its strict rules, there is a clear pattern where the indication of person is mainly consistent regardless of the type or class of verbs.

Animate intransitive independent verbs
The chart below presents the affixes taken by animate intransitive verbs. The first and second singular persons usually take the ne-/ ke- prefix, unless the verb ends with a long ā, in which case it takes a ne-m/ke-m circumfix. In the plural, first person has two forms, 'we' inclusive and 'we' exclusive.

Transitive inanimate independent indicative verbs
The second group of verbs is for inanimate transitive verbs. These verbs only have singular subjects, but that does not prevent them from having a singular and plural form. These verbs also fall into three different classes of their own and well as two negative forms.

Transitive animate verbs
This class of verb is used to express actions done to other people and things. Notice the hierarchy that occurs, especially in the first singular form with a second singular object. When referring to an I–to–you relationship, like  'I love you,' a variant of the second person prefix, ko-, is used instead of the first person ne- prefix even though 'I' is the subject.

Syntax
Possibly due to the fact that Siebert's research was more focused on reconstructing Powhatan for the purpose of comparing it to Proto-Algonquian or because the notes of Smith and Strachey do not lend themselves to analyzing it, syntax is not discussed in Siebert's research nor are there any examples of what sentences might have been like. However, by looking at other languages in the same family as Powhatan, some basic patterns can be established:

It has been established that Powhatan is considered an agglutinative language, meaning that morphemes can be added on to words to communicate more descriptive meanings. This happens especially in verbs, allowing one long word to basically represent a whole sentence. This almost eliminates the importance of word order.

Other languages in the Algonquian family are marked with obviative/proximate endings, which clarify the subjects of focus, especially in telling stories.

There is not enough data recorded to put together a definite list of the imperatives, but Strachey documents imperatives being used. Therefore, using those lists and what is known about Proto-Eastern Algonquian, a tentative list can be created. Some examples of these imperatives are as follows:  'arise you!';  'come you all!';  'you take it away from there!';  'you eat it!';  'you all eat it!';

Finally, as explained in the transitive animate verbs section, there are circumstances of animacy hierarchy with direct objects in Powhatan. Instead of the hierarchy going first person, second person, third person, there is a pattern of second person, first person, third person. For example, to say 'I strike him' would be , where the ne- prefix for first person is first and the -āw for third person is at the end. However, to say something like 'I feed you', it would be  with the ke- prefix for second person at the beginning and a different -es suffix for first person at the end. This might be a result of a practice of respect for others before oneself. "It is one of the few languages that give greater importance to the listener than the speaker," Dr. Blair Rudes, the linguist who worked on reconstructing the language for the movie The New World, remarked in an interview.

Dialect variation

Siebert's 1975 study also examined evidence for dialect variation. He found insufficient justification for assigning any apparent dialects to particular areas. Strachey's material reflects considerable lexical variation and minor phonological variation, suggesting the existence of dialect differentiation. A speculative connection to the Chickahominy and Pamunkey Virginia Algonquian tribes has been suggested, but there is no evidence to support this link.

The table below gives a sample of words reflecting lexical variation. Each word is given as written by Smith or Strachey, followed by a proposed phonemic representation.

See also

 Carolina Algonquian
 List of English words of Algonquian origin

Notes

References

External links
Language Resources of Virginia Indians
Native Languages of the Americas: Powhatan
 [requires flash]
 [link broken]

OLAC resources in and about the Powhatan language

Eastern Algonquian languages

Indigenous languages of the North American eastern woodlands
Indigenous languages of Maryland
Extinct languages of North America
Languages extinct in the 18th century
Native American language revitalization